Stipe Žunić (born 13 December 1990) is a Croatian athlete specialising in the shot put, having switched from the javelin throw in 2013. He finished third at the 2017 World Championships in Athletics, fourth at the 2014 European Athletics Championships and seventh at the 2015 European Athletics Indoor Championships.

Before switching to athletics in 2008, he competed in kick-boxing. He is a former World Junior Champion in that discipline, winning 65 out of his 70 fights. Žunić took up javelin throw, but suffered a major injury. After elbow surgery in 2013, Žunić switched to shot put.

He studied sociology at the University of Florida in Gainesville.

Competition record

Personal bests
Outdoor
Shot put – 21.48 (Slovenska Bistrica 2017) NR
Discus throw – 58.31 (Bar 2014)
Javelin throw – 77.89 (Austin 2012)
Indoor
Shot put – 21.11 (Fayetteville 2015)

References

1990 births
Living people
Croatian male shot putters
Croatian male javelin throwers
Croatian male kickboxers
Florida Gators men's track and field athletes
Athletes (track and field) at the 2016 Summer Olympics
Olympic athletes of Croatia
World Athletics Championships athletes for Croatia
World Athletics Championships medalists
Athletes (track and field) at the 2018 Mediterranean Games
Mediterranean Games silver medalists for Croatia
Mediterranean Games medalists in athletics
21st-century Croatian people
20th-century Croatian people